Boggy Depot is a ghost town and Oklahoma State Park that was formerly a significant city in the Indian Territory. It grew as a vibrant and thriving town in present-day Atoka County, Oklahoma, United States, and became a major trading center on the Texas Road and the Butterfield Overland Mail route between Missouri and San Francisco. After the Civil War, when the MKT Railroad came through the area, it bypassed Boggy Depot and the town began a steady decline. It was soon replaced by Atoka as the chief city in the area.  By the early 20th century, all that remained of the community was a sort of ghost town.

History
Choctaw and Chickasaw Indians founded the town in 1837.  The United States government had moved the Choctaws and Chickasaws to Indian Territory from Mississippi and Alabama in the 1830s.  While at first the two tribes lived together on the Choctaw land, the Chickasaws later emigrated to the western portions of the Indian Territory and formed their own separate nation on land transferred to them by the Choctaw.

Boggy Depot was located in Atoka County, Choctaw Nation, a territorial-era government unit that included portions of today's Atoka, Coal, Hughes and Pittsburg counties.

In 1834, General Henry Leavenworth built the military road from Camp Washita (later Fort Washita) to Fort Gibson.  For years this road served as a dividing line between the Choctaw and Chickasaw lands.  Afterwards a treaty created a formal dividing line between the nations, with Boggy Depot on the east side of the line in Choctaw lands.  The Reverend Cyrus Kingsbury established the church in Boggy Depot in 1840. The church building was the temporary capitol of the Choctaw Nation in 1859. Boggy Depot received a post office in 1848,  and in 1858 became a stop on the Butterfield Overland Stage line.  During the Civil War, a Union raiding party fought a Confederate group at the Battle of Middle Boggy Depot a few miles northeast of Boggy Depot, which had become the major supply depot in Indian Territory for the Confederates.  After the Civil War with Boggy Depot in the Choctaw Nation, many of the original settlers, mostly Chickasaws, abandoned Boggy Depot.  A small community formed near this time two miles (3 km) south of Boggy Depot named New Boggy Depot. The former Boggy Depot post office was moved to the new location and renamed New Boggy Depot on March 22, 1872. It was renamed as Boggy Depot on December 26, 1883. Choctaw Chief Allen Wright, who lived at Boggy Depot, coined the word 'Oklahoma' in 1866 to describe the Indian Territory.  The name was officially used for the state in 1907.  In 1869 Oklahoma's first Masonic Lodge was founded in Boggy Depot.

As part of the treaty between the Five Civilized Tribes and the United States government at the end of the Civil War the tribes had to allow the construction of a north to south railroad across their lands. This railroad became a reality in 1872. The city of Atoka, on the railroad, flourished while Boggy Depot languished and became a ghost town. The Boggy Depot post office officially closed on July 31, 1934.

Current status
Today little remains of the original town except for a few stone foundations and the cemetery. Choctaw Chief Allen Wright and the Reverend Cyrus Kingsbury are buried there. Boggy Depot Park , formerly known as Boggy Depot State Park, is a recreation area that commemorates the old town and the history of the area.  The park gets its name from Clear Boggy Creek and from its use as a Confederate commissary depot during the Civil War. The park features a fishing lake, nature trail, baseball diamond, playground, picnic tables, group picnic shelters, charcoal grills, and comfort stations with showers. After the state announced that it would close the park as a budget-cutting measure, the Choctaw tribe took over ownership and management responsibilities. This is no longer a state park. Boggy Depot was added to the National Register of Historic Places (#72001050) in 1972.

The Chickasaw nation was reluctant to spend its funds on major capital improvements unless it had clear title to the property. In 2013, the Oklahoma House of Representatives considered a bill to transfer ownership of the property to the Chickasaws.

Media
Jerry Cantrell from the rock band Alice in Chains, named his first solo album Boggy Depot after the area where his father grew up. The album cover shows Cantrell covered in mud standing waist-deep in a branch of the Boggy River.

Notes

References

Further reading
 Morris, John W. Ghost Towns of Oklahoma (Norman: University of Oklahoma Press, 1977). 
 Wright, Muriel H. "Old Boggy Depot", Chronicles of Oklahoma5:1 (March 1927) 4-17 (retrieved August 16, 2006).
 Bostic, E. McCurdy.  "Elizabeth Fulton Hester", Chronicles of Oklahoma6:4 (December 1928) 449-452 (retrieved November 19, 2008).
 Foreman, Grant.  Down the Texas Road: Historic Places along Highway 69 Through Oklahoma (Norman: University of Oklahoma Press, 1936).
 Lewis, Anna.  "Trading Post at the Crossing of the Chickasaw Trails", Chronicles of Oklahoma12:4 (December 1934) 447-453 (retrieved November 19, 2008).
 Meserve, John Bartlett.  "Governor William Malcolm Guy", Chronicles of Oklahoma19:1 (March 1941) 10-13 (retrieved November 19, 2008).
 Wright, Muriel H.  and LeRoy H. Fischer. "Civil War Sites in Oklahoma," The Chronicles of Oklahoma 44 (Summer 1966).
 Wright, Muriel H.  "Historic Places on the Old Stage Line from Fort Smith to Red River" The Chronicles of Oklahoma 11:2 (June 1933).

External links
 Boggy Depot State Park
 Red River Historian - Boggy Depot
 Encyclopedia of Oklahoma History and Culture - Boggy Depot

Protected areas of Atoka County, Oklahoma
Ghost towns in Oklahoma
Butterfield Overland Mail in Indian Territory
Transportation buildings and structures on the National Register of Historic Places in Oklahoma
Parks in Oklahoma
Stagecoach stations on the National Register of Historic Places in Oklahoma
Pre-statehood history of Oklahoma
National Register of Historic Places in Atoka County, Oklahoma
Stagecoach stops in the United States
Populated places on the National Register of Historic Places